Colline-Beaumont is a commune in the Pas-de-Calais department in the Hauts-de-France region of France.

Geography
A small village situated some 11 miles (17 km) south of Montreuil-sur-Mer on the D141 and D143 road junction, by the banks of the river Authie, the border with the Somme department.

Population

See also
Communes of the Pas-de-Calais department

References

Collinebeaumont